White genocide is a descriptive term that is used in the Armenian diaspora, for the threat of assimilation, especially in the Western world.

During the late 19th and the early 20th centuries, the Armenians who lived in their ancestral lands that were then part of the Ottoman Empire were targeted for systematic extermination. From 1894 to 1896, up to 300,000 Armenians were killed in the Hamidian massacres. From 1915 to 1923, the Armenian genocide took the lives of around 1.5 million Armenians, who were killed by the Ottoman government.

The German political scientist Christoph Zürcher wrote in his 2007 book The Post-Soviet Wars: Rebellion, Ethnic Conflict, and Nationhood in the Caucasus: 

"Genocide" became a key word, which had several connotations. "White" genocide or "white" massacre denoted the repression, assimilation, or forced migration of Armenians from their historical lands (which were far larger than Soviet Armenia and included Karabakh, as well as areas belonging to contemporary Turkey).

Western Armenians consider Armenians who assimilate to the local population of the country to which they were eventually forced to emigrate (such as United States, France, Argentina, Brazil and Canada) as lost to their nation because of the continuing exile after the actual genocide itself, and they thus consider that lost Armenian to be another victim of the genocidal attempt to eliminate the Armenians.

In July 2022, a student from Toronto, Canada named Artashes Keshishyan published a book called The White Genocide: Explaining the Origins of It and Providing the Solution, which is considered the only and the first work in the world that explains the assimilation issue in the Armenian diaspora and Armenia in detail. In his book, Keshishyan breaks down the White Genocide into five categories: linguistics, musical, nominal, traditional, and historical assimilations. In his book, Keshishyan states:"Nations that assimilate have no future."The term has also been used by some Armenians to describe the discrimination and assimilation against Armenians since 1918 in Nagorno-Karabakh and Nakhchivan, which has caused Armenians to leave their homes. Some have also used it for the Javakheti, which includes an Armenian population.

Genocidal massacres (1918-present)

See also
Armenian diaspora
Armenians in Turkey
Crypto-Armenians
Silent Holocaust

References 

Aftermath of the Armenian genocide
Cultural assimilation
Armenian diaspora
Anti-Western sentiment